D.C. Sniper: 23 Days of Fear (also known as Sniper: 23 Days of Fear in Washington D.C.) is a 2003 TV movie created by USA Network based on the Beltway sniper attacks of 2002.

The films chronicles the period when John Allen Muhammad (played by Bobby Hosea) and Lee Boyd Malvo (played by Trent Cameron) went on a serial killing spree in October 2002 in Virginia, Washington, D.C., and Maryland, all parts of the Washington Metropolitan Area, the entire area of which was held in a "grip of terror."

Plot
In October 2002, Chief Charles Moose (played by Charles S. Dutton) of the Montgomery County Police Department, heads an effort to track down those responsible for a recent string of murders in Montgomery County, Maryland.

Unable to give anything but small pieces of information at various press conferences held during the 23 dark days, Moose finds himself vilified and derided in many corners as ineffectual and incompetent. Indeed, quite a few newspapers outside the area targeted by snipers came right out and called for Moose's resignation. But the chief's dogged persistence ultimately paid off and — in the sort of twist that a professional writer of thrillers might dismiss as inconceivable — the two men arrested for the carnage turned out to be the archetypal "least likely suspects."

Release
D.C. Sniper: 23 Days of Fear originally aired on the USA Network on October 17, 2003, just as John Allen Muhammad and John Lee Malvo's murder trials were getting underway.

References

External links 

2003 films
2003 television films
Films scored by Mark Snow
Films about snipers
Crime films based on actual events
Films directed by Tom McLoughlin
Films set in 2002
Films set in Montgomery County, Maryland
Films set in Virginia
Films set in Washington, D.C.
USA Network original films
Films set in Frederick County, Maryland
2004 films
2007 films